Thomas Whyte (or White;  – 12 June 1588) was an English clergyman and academic at the University of Oxford.

Whyte was educated at Winchester College, where he gained a scholarship aged 12 in 1526, and New College, Oxford, holding a fellowship 1532–1553, and graduating B.C.L. 1541, D.C.L. 1553.

Whyte was elected Warden (head) of New College, Oxford, in 1553, a post he held until 1573.
He was twice Vice-Chancellor of Oxford University during 1557–8 and 1562–4.

He was Archdeacon of Berkshire from 1557 and Chancellor of Salisbury Cathedral from 1571, holding both offices until his death.

Whyte died on 12 June 1588, and was buried in Salisbury Cathedral.

References

1510s births
1588 deaths
People educated at Winchester College
Alumni of New College, Oxford
Wardens of New College, Oxford
Vice-Chancellors of the University of Oxford
Archdeacons of Berkshire